Van Winkle–Fox House is located in Oakland, Bergen County, New Jersey, United States. The house was added to the National Register of Historic Places on January 10, 1983.

See also
National Register of Historic Places listings in Bergen County, New Jersey

References

External links
 Google Street View of Van Winkle–Fox House

Houses on the National Register of Historic Places in New Jersey
Houses in Bergen County, New Jersey
National Register of Historic Places in Bergen County, New Jersey
Oakland, New Jersey
New Jersey Register of Historic Places